Fold A to B is the second full-length album by Canadian punk rock band The Salads. It was released in 2003, on Maui Wowie Records, and distributed by EMI Music Canada. It is an enhanced CD, and features the videos for both "Get Loose", and "Who's that Kat?". The title of the album is a reference to the Mad Fold-in by Mad magazine and the font of the album cover title is a reference to the magazine as well.

Recorded in the fall of 2002, this album was The Salads' breakthrough album. It spawned three hit singles, "Get Loose", "The Roth Kung Fu", and "Unhappy", which were all radio hits in Canada. the first single, "Get Loose", was featured in a few Labatt Blue commercials, and was the most successful single from this album, and got steady play on MuchMusic upon its release. It was also on the soundtrack and film score to EuroTrip.  The band was also featured playing the song in the second episode of Instant Star. This song along with "The Roth Kung Fu" were featured in the sixth season of Degrassi: The Next Generation.

Track listing
 Get Loose (2:24)
 Free Your Pain (2:59)
 Unhappy (3:42)
 The Roth Kung Fu (2:35)
 Time 4 Change (3:02)
 Who's That Kat? (3:16)
 2 Kool 4 Skool (2:53)
 Forever & a Day (2:59)
 Why It Gotta Be (3:23)
 Who We Are (2:56)
 Whachewlookinah?! (Woop Woop) (2:29)
 Come Around (19:59)

A hidden track is featured after Come Around.

Album credits
Chuck Dailey: Bass, Backing Vocals
Libydo: Dancer, Backing Vocals
Mista D: Vocals
Dave Ziemba: Guitar
Grant Taylor: Drums, Backing Vocals
Siegfried Meier - engineer, mastering, mixing

Source of name
The booklet for this disc features a fold-in, to support the name of the album. When folded, it shows the band's answer to many suggestions that they change their name.  Inspired by a similar regular feature in Mad.

References

2003 albums
The Salads albums